In particle physics, a hermetic detector (also called a 4π detector) is a particle detector designed to observe all possible decay products of an interaction between subatomic particles in a collider by covering as large an area around the interaction point as possible and incorporating multiple types of sub-detectors. They are typically roughly cylindrical, with different types of detectors wrapped around each other in concentric layers; each detector type specializes in particular particles so that almost any particle will be detected and identified. Such detectors are called "hermetic" because they are constructed  so as the motion of  particles are ceased at the boundaries of the chamber without any moving beyond due to the seals; the name "4π detector" comes from the fact that such detectors are designed to cover nearly all of the 4π steradians of solid angle around the interaction point; in terms of the standard coordinate system used in collider physics, this is equivalent to coverage of the entire range of azimuthal angle and pseudorapidity. In practice, particles with pseudorapidity above a certain threshold cannot be measured since they are too nearly parallel to the beamline and can thus pass through the detector. This limit on the pseudorapidity ranges which can be observed forms part of the acceptance of the detector (i.e. the range of phase space which it is able to observe); broadly speaking, the main design objective of a hermetic detector is to maximise acceptance, i.e. to ensure that the detector is able to measure as large a phase space region as possible.

The first such detector was the Mark I at the Stanford Linear Accelerator Center, and the basic design has been used for all subsequent collider detectors.  Prior to the building of the Mark I, it was thought that most particle decay products would have relatively low transverse momentum (i.e. momentum perpendicular to the beamline), so that detectors could cover this area only.  However, it was learned at the Mark I and subsequent experiments that most fundamental particle interactions at colliders involve very large exchanges of energy and therefore large transverse momenta are not uncommon; for this reason, large angular coverage is critical for modern particle physics.

More recent hermetic detectors include the CDF and DØ detectors at Fermilab's Tevatron accelerator, as well as the ATLAS and CMS detectors at CERN's LHC. These machines have a hermetic construction because they are general-purpose detectors, meaning that they are able to study a wide range of phenomena in high-energy physics. More specialised detectors do not necessarily have a hermetic construction; for example, LHCb covers only the forward (high-pseudorapidity) region, because this corresponds to the phase space region of greatest interest to its physics program.

Components

There are three main components of a hermetic detector.  From the inside out, the first is a tracker, which measures the momentum of charged particles as they curve in a magnetic field.  Next there are one or more calorimeters, which measure the energy of most charged and neutral particles by absorbing them in dense material, and a muon system which measures the one type of particle that is not stopped through the calorimeters and can still be detected.  Each component may have several different specialized sub-components.

Trackers
The detector's magnetic field causes the particle to rotate by accelerating it in a direction perpendicular to its motion via the Lorentz force. The tracking system plots the helix traced by such a charged particle as it travels through a magnetic field by localizing it in space in finely-segmented layers of detecting material, usually silicon.

Calorimeters

Calorimeters slow particles down and absorb their energy into a material, allowing that energy to be measured.  They are often divided into two types: the electromagnetic calorimeter that specializes in absorbing particles that interact electromagnetically, and the hadronic calorimeter that can detect hadrons, which interact via the strong nuclear force. A hadronic detector is required in particular to detect heavy neutral particles.

Muon system
Of all the known stable particles, only muons and neutrinos pass through the calorimeter without losing most or all of their energy.  Neutrinos cannot be directly observed at collider experiments owing to their extremely small interaction cross section with hadronic matter (such as the detector is made of), and their existence must be inferred from the so-called "missing" (transverse) energy which is computed once all other particles in the event are accounted for. However muons (which are charged) can be measured by an additional tracking system outside the calorimeters.

Particle identification

Most particles have unique combinations of signals left in each detector sub-system, allowing different particles to be identified.  For example, an electron is charged and interacts electromagnetically, so it is tracked by the tracker and then deposits all of its energy in the (electromagnetic) calorimeter.  By contrast, a photon is neutral and interacts electromagnetically, so it deposits its energy in the calorimeter without leaving a track.

See also
 ATLAS experiment, for a detailed description of such a detector.
 Compact Muon Solenoid, for a well-illustrated description of another such detector.

References

Particle detectors